Russia and Belarus are boycotted by many companies and organisations in Europe, North America, Australasia, and elsewhere, in response to the 2022 Russian invasion of Ukraine, which is supported by Belarus. , the Yale School of Management records more than 1,000 companies withdrawing or divesting themselves from Russia, either as a result of sanctions or in protest of Russian actions.

Overview
The majority of countries which sanctioned Russia following its 2014 annexation of Crimea began imposing additional sanctions to punish Russia for invading all of Ukraine — a move for which Russian President Vladimir Putin had long prepared. Many companies were not impacted by sanctions against Russia but ruled in favor of cutting ties with the country either due to the public pressure or in protest of the Russian government's actions, or both. Ukrainian institutions have stated that the need for these measures is urgent.

The response can be broadly divided into a "cultural boycott", aimed at amplifying the international condemnation of the invasion, and an "economic boycott", which is designed to make the war effort less sustainable. As a result of the latter, several commentators have warned of an unprecedented economic collapse in Russia's future, citing a 30% drop in the ruble's value, a 20% rise in interest rates and a 1% GDP expansion down from 1.7%. Analyses by multiple firms project year end GDP contraction of at least 5% and inflation of 15%. Some of the most critical blows to Russian infrastructure have been the loss of access to the SWIFT payment system and limitations on Russia's ability to export oil. US Senator Bernie Sanders has stated that this crisis should influence energy policy more broadly in order to deter "authoritarian petrostates". While Shell plc has been noted for relinquishing its stake in Gazprom, it was also criticised for buying a cargo of discounted Russian crude oil. The next day, following public outcry, Shell defended the purchase as a short term necessity, but also announced that it intends to reduce such purchases and put the profits from them into a fund that will go towards humanitarian aid to Ukraine. As of 10 March, half of the ten largest international companies with business ties to Russia announced that they are withdrawing or closing their operations; and the number of companies that have done so is over 300.

Some of the largest snack and fast food companies have faced criticism for continuing to do business in Russia and Belarus. Anthony Pompliano has defended cryptocurrency trading platforms for not participating in the boycott, stating "there is an incredible amount of inhumanity that goes into the decision to cut off the average citizen from the global financial system. What was their crime?" Critics of the Israeli government have pointed out that several American politicians who support isolating Russia economically previously campaigned for and passed anti-BDS laws punishing boycotts of Israel.

The cultural side of the boycott has focused on reducing the number of entertainment products available to people in Russia. These include films and albums but also live televised events that are hosted in Western countries. Yasmeen Serhan has commented that nationalistic sentiment, which has historically benefited Putin's regime, will be undermined by Russia's exclusion from sporting events. The banning of Russia and Belarus from the Olympics has drawn comparisons to the athletic boycott of apartheid South Africa. According to Olympic historians David Wallechinsky and Bill Mallon, the decision can be considered a turning point when compared to past leniency over the state-sponsored doping programme in Russia or the attempted abduction of Krystsina Tsimanouskaya by Belarus.

In addition to cancelling planned appearances in Russia, several entertainment organisations with Russian members began to scrutinise their past support for Putin. Some of these celebrities refused to condemn the war but others lost their contracts because they did so without mentioning Putin by name. A statement by Alex Ovechkin, for example, called for peace in general and mentioned that his family members in Russia were also in danger. However, Czech former Detroit Red Wings and Ottawa Senators goaltender Dominik Hašek responded to Ovechkin and criticised him for his past support of Putin, stating "What!? Not only an alibist, a chicken shit, but also a liar!", while also calling on the NHL to suspend all Russian players. One musician who referred to his family's safety when condemning the war was Alexander Malofeev. The Vancouver Recital Society, which had begun requiring this of all Russian performers, responded that Malofeev's statement was not sufficient to allow his concert to go ahead.

Despite ongoing sanctions, 47 of the world's biggest 200 companies still have not left Russia, particularly energy companies remain invested there. U.K. energy giant Shell and Japanese trading firms Mitsui and Mitsubishi hold double-digit stakes in the Sakhalin-2 oil and natural gas project. On July 1, 2022, Putin signed a decree to allow the government to seize the Sakhalin-2 oil and natural gas project but further attempts to formally nationalize the assets of international firms were paused when the bill did not make it through the State Duma before the 2022 summer recess.  According to Western analysts, remaining companies have experienced expropriation and nationalization pressures, but officially Russia has denied that it is interested in such actions. In August 2022, Russia's trade and industry minister Denis Manturov stated, "we are not interested in the nationalization of enterprises or their removal.”

Sunny Liger
Sunny Liger, a tanker of the Marshall Islands with Russian gas oil, was refused by port workers in Sweden as dock workers refused to touch the cargo of Sunny Liger in protest against the war in Ukraine. Although the ship sails under the flag of the Marshall Islands, the cargo is controversial because of the war in Ukraine. On 29 April the tanker set course for the port of Rotterdam but later seemed to be the port of Amsterdam in the Netherlands. The Dutch cabinet stated it cannot do anything against the docking of the ship, because she does not sail under the Russian flag and the cargo is not subject to European sanctions. The FNV Havens union tried to persuade the parties involved to refuse the Sunny Liger. Minister Wopke Hoekstra of Foreign Affairs supports the trade union's call. That night the vessel anchored off the Dutch coast. The next morning, on 30 April, the intention was for the ship to enter the port of Amsterdam, but port employees there refuse to unload her. The municipality of Amsterdam, the sole shareholder of the port authority, states it finds it undesirable for Sunny Liger to unload in the port of Amsterdam. A spokesperson of the Ukrainian Ministry of Foreign Affairs also asks Amsterdam port workers not to unload the ship. During the evening of 30 April it is still unclear whether Sunny Liger will try to dock in the port of Amsterdam.

Boycotting companies and organisations

Banking and finance

Other 
 The Church of England announced on 25 February it will sell £20m in Russian holdings held by its Church Commissioners and the Church of England Pensions Board. The church also said it would not make any further investments in Russia, calling it an "immoral flood of corrupt money".

Education, research and science

Energy

Entertainment

Video games and esports

Food and beverage

Goods

Automotive

Apparel and accessories

Other

Services

Shipping and transport

Aviation

Space 

Continued international collaboration on missions to the International Space Station (ISS) has been thrown into doubt.

A petition to withdraw international support from Russian satellite navigation system GLONASS and boycott the platform has been proposed by Polish engineer Daniel Kucharski from  University of Texas at Austin and signed by tens of thousands of individuals. It is now being considered by ILRS.

Sports 

 Full boycotts

 Partial boycotts

 Broadcasting rights
 The English Premier League announced that they will cancel its broadcast rights with Russian television network Match which supposed to be started in the 2022/23 season, its current broadcaster Okko Sport will end the rights to the league earlier.

Technology

Tourism and hospitality

Other

Airspace closures 

By 5 March 2022, the following countries and territories had completely closed their airspace to all Russian airlines and Russian-registered private jets:

 (since 2015)

 (EU27)

The European Union had already banned all Belarusian aircraft from EU airspace in June 2021 in response to the forced landing of Ryanair Flight 4978.

As well, airlines from many other countries have diverted their flights away from Russian airspace, despite not being banned by Russia or not slapping a ban on Russian aircraft. This includes:

 (Except flights to/from New York, Boston or Toronto, but would be unable to divert to Russian airports)

 (Singapore Airlines had already diverted their flights away from Belarus after Ryanair Flight 4978 incident)

Breaking of diplomatic relations 
Both Ukraine and the Federated States of Micronesia indefinitely severed all diplomatic ties with Russia.

Controversy

Criticism 
Critics of the boycott and sanctions have predicted that they would not cause significant changes in the Russian government's policy. Patrick Cockburn argued that sanctions similar to those used against Iraq will cause widespread poverty and claim more lives than the use of military force. Others have supported the cultural boycott but called for economic coercion to be narrowly targeted. Some critics noted that the decision of major credit card companies to suspend their operations in Russia will affect any Russian who has taken out a credit card in their home country, including those who have protested against the war in Ukraine, who are trying to flee Russia or are now living abroad.

Activists in Russia believe that amid lost access to financial and educational institutions, Putin will be better able to paint Western countries as the enemy. Carnegie Moscow Center scholar Andrey Movchan wrote that sanctions aimed at ordinary Russians could be "exactly what the Kremlin wants – that tens of millions of Russians who oppose the regime will be unable to leave the country and even temporarily find themselves in a world free of Russian propaganda," stating that sanctions should instead "uncompromisingly block the Kremlin's access to its financial and technological resources."

Cloudflare CEO Matthew Prince stated that "if Cloudflare were to stop operating in Russia, the Russian government would celebrate us shutting down" because "indiscriminately terminating service would do little to harm the Russian government, but would both limit access to information outside the country, and make significantly more vulnerable those who have used us to shield themselves as they have criticized the government".

Regarding the cultural boycott, Patrick West wrote that many parts had become a vehicle for Russophobia, notably an incident in which the University of Milano-Bicocca in Italy considered cancelling a course on Dostoyevski but ultimately did not. A decision by the Cardiff Philharmonic Orchestra to cancel a planned performance of Tchaikovsky's 1812 Overture was met with similar controversy. One of the directors stated that continuing with the original concert would have been offensive due to the themes of Russian military pride and not simply because Tchaikovsky was Russian. Discussing these issues, the communications coordinator for Diem25 expressed regret that Netflix was suspending its adaptation of Anna Karenina due to the involvement of a Russian production company.

Some critics have argued that Western companies and sports organizations such as FIFA and the IOC have acted hypocritically by boycotting Russia but not the United States for the actions of the U.S. military during the Iraq War, China for the Uyghur genocide, or Qatar and Saudi Arabia for human rights violations and military intervention in Yemen. Business professor Stanislav Markus has suggested that boycotts of Russia might expand to include more countries as the companies involved become increasingly comfortable with deglobalisation.

Polling within Russia 

A Kremlin-associated poll claimed that the 68% of the Russian population approves of the "special military operation" in Ukraine while independent polls put that number at 58%. The Kremlin-associated poll, which was conducted between February 28 and March 6, claimed that Putin's approval rating was 74.6%. According to the poll, in the group of 18-to-24-year-olds, only 29% Russians supported the "special military operation" in Ukraine. Two reasons many Russians still support Putin and the "special military operation" in Ukraine has to do with the propaganda and disinformation being sown by the Kremlin, and the antagonization and discrimination by Western populations/institutions of Russian people. Some Russians publicly displayed the infamous "Z" letter. Russian gymnast Ivan Kuliak displayed it while standing on a victory podium near a Ukrainian athlete and later expressed no regret for doing that. More than 200,000 attended Vladimir Putin's pro-war nationalist rally at the Luzhniki Stadium on 18 March, with many forced by their employers to attend.

A series of four online polls of Moscow residents by Alexei Navalny's Anti-Corruption Foundation claimed that between February 25 and March 3, the share of respondents in Moscow who considered Russia an "aggressor" increased from 29% to 53%, while the share of those who considered Russia a "peacemaker" fell by half from 25% to 12%.

Some observers noted what they described as a "generational struggle" among Russians over perception of the war, with younger Russians generally opposed to the war and older Russians more likely to accept the narrative presented by state-controlled media in Russia, the main source of news for most Russians. Kataryna Wolczuk, an associate fellow of Chatham House's Russia and Eurasia programme, said that "[Older] Russians are inclined to think in line with the official 'narrative' that Russia is defending Russian speakers in Ukraine, so it's about offering protection rather than aggression." A poll by the independent Levada Center published on 30 March saw Putin's approval rating jump from 71% in February to 83% in March. However, many respondents do not want to answer pollsters' questions for fear of negative consequences. In March 2022, when a Russian politician Maxim Katz and a group of Russian researchers commissioned a poll on Russians’ attitudes toward the war in Ukraine, 29,400 of the 31,000 people they called refused to answer after hearing the theme of the question.

Companies criticised for not joining the boycott 
A number of companies have faced growing pressure to halt operations in Russia, but have not yet done so. Those include:
 Accor, a French hospitality company, with 55 locations in Russia.
 AmerisourceBergen, an American healthcare company, maintains research depots in Russia.
 Arconic, an American industrial company.
 Binance, one of world's largest crypto exchanges, refused to ban all Russian accounts. However, Binance announced that it has donated more than $10 million to its Ukrainian Emergency Relief Fund and $2.5 million to UNICEF's efforts in Ukraine.
 Bosch, is one of the largest German multinational engineering and technology companies headquartered in Gerlingen.
 Bridgestone, a Japanese auto and truck parts manufacturer.
 Burger King, an American fast food chain.
 Citigroup, an American bank.
 COSCO, a Chinese container shipping company, and one of the largest container shipping companies in the world.
 Credit Suisse, a global investment bank and financial services firm founded and based in Switzerland. Credit Suisse has declared that its Moscow offices remain open, as it was trying to shred evidence of $1.7 billion Russian loans backed by yachts.
 Deutsche Bank, a German multinational investment bank and financial services company headquartered in Frankfurt, Germany, and dual-listed on the FWB and the NYSE. According to The New Yorker, Deutsche Bank has long had an "abject" reputation among major banks, as it has been involved in major scandals across different issue areas.
 Dyson, the multi-national technology company. 
 Ferragamo, an Italian luxury goods company.
 French retail companies owned wholly or partially by members of the Mulliez family:
 Auchan, a supermarket chain which in 2016 was ranked first in a list of the largest foreign-owned companies by the Russian edition of Forbes, with revenue in Russia of more than $5 billion.
 Leroy Merlin, a home improvement and DIY retailer, operates 112 stores in Russia. On 11 March the company announced it has no plans to reduce its operations in Russia.
 Herbalife, an American marketing company.
 International Paper, an American paper and pulp manufacturer.
 Japan Tobacco International, the top tobacco company in Russia, which controls 37% of the Russian tobacco market.
 Kia, a South Korean car manufacturer and Russia's third-largest carmaker as of 2016.
 Kimberly-Clark, an American personal care corporation.
 Koch Industries, an American conglomerate.
 Lenovo, a Chinese hardware and electronics manufacturer.
 Metro AG, a German company which operates cash and carry stores in Russia.
 Micro-Star International, Taiwanese multinational information technology corporation.
 Mohawk Industries, an American manufacturer.
 Nokian Tyres, which produces 80% of its tyres in Russia and employs around 1,600 people.
 Otis Worldwide, an American elevator and escalator manufacturer. It announced on 11 March that is suspending new sales of its elevators and escalators in Russia while continuing all existing maintenance deals.
 Pirelli, an Italian tyre manufacturer.
 Renault, a French automobile company.
 Timken, an American industrial company.
 Whirlpool, American manufacturer and marketer of home appliances.

See also
 Corporate responses to the 2022 Russian invasion of Ukraine
 List of companies that applied sanctions during the Russo-Ukrainian War
 List of people and organizations sanctioned during the Russo-Ukrainian War
 International sanctions during the 2022 Russian invasion of Ukraine
 Disinvestment from Iran
 Disinvestment from Israel
 Disinvestment from South Africa
 "Do not buy Russian goods!"
 Boycott Russian Films

References

Reactions to the 2022 Russian invasion of Ukraine
Anti-Russian sentiment
Disinvestment
International sanctions
Boycotts of Belarus
2022
Foreign relations of Belarus
Foreign relations of Russia